Zhubi Airport is a dual-use airport on Subi Reef located in Spratly Islands.

History 
Construction began in August 2015.

On July 12, 2016, the Chinese government used a Cessna CE-680 aircraft from the Civil Aviation Flight Check Center of China to conduct a check flight on the newly built airport and it succeeded. 

On July 13, 2016, the Chinese government requisitioned a civil airliner of Hainan Airlines. It departed from Haikou Meilan International Airport and landed at the newly-built airport. It returned in the afternoon of the same day to complete the test flight.

Facilities 
Subi Airport has a  x  runway, a terminal building, 20 hangars, and 2 helicopter platforms. While airport can be used by civilian aircraft no schedule airline currently uses this airport.

References 

Airports in Hainan
Airports established in 2016
2016 establishments in China